The 1930 Navy Midshipmen football team represented the United States Naval Academy during the 1930 college football season. In their fifth season under head coach Bill Ingram, the Midshipmen compiled a 6–5 record, shut out four opponents, and outscored all opponents by a combined score of 148 to 117.

Schedule

References

Navy
Navy Midshipmen football seasons
Navy Midshipmen football